Circle is the eleventh studio album by Finnish heavy metal band Amorphis, released on 17 April 2013 through Victor Entertainment and on 19 April 2013 through Nuclear Blast. Recorded at Petrax Studio in Hollola and at 5K Studios in Helsinki, it is the first Amorphis album since Far from the Sun (2003) not to be produced by Marko Hietala, or to be based on the Finnish national epic Kalevala. Instead, Circle was produced by Peter Tägtgren and focuses on an original story penned by lyricist Pekka Kainulainen.

Writing and recording 
In August 2012, Amorphis announced that they were going to start recording a new album the following month. Circle was recorded at Petrax Studio in Hollola and at 5K Studios in Helsinki. Peter Tägtgren, who had previously worked with Children of Bodom, Celtic Frost and Dimmu Borgir, among others, produced and mixed the album. As Tomi Koivusaari observed, the band was initially surprised by the up-front position that Tägtgren gave to the guitars relative to the keyboards. Bassist Niclas Etelävuori used a five-string bass on Circle, which was tuned a whole step down. Regarding the writing and recording process, guitarist Esa Holopainen stated:

Koivusaari further explained that the band needed to make a change to the recording process to maintain its inspiration. The band chose a "peaceful place" in the countryside to record, which, Koivusaari felt, led to the distinctive atmosphere.

Lyrical concept 
Lyrics were once again written by Pekka Kainulainen, who has worked with Amorphis since 2007's Silent Waters. Up to this point all of Kainulainen's lyrics had been based on the Finnish national epic Kalevala, but on Circle they focus on an original concept. Kainulainen later gave a short summary of the album's concept:

Release and promotion 
When Amorphis announced that they would begin recording their eleventh studio album in September 2012, they also announced that it would be released in spring the following year. On 10 September the band released a studio update via YouTube. The second and third studio updates were released on 17 and 25 September respectively. The fourth and final studio update was released on 7 March 2013. During a Finnish tour in late 2012, Amorphis performed the song "Shades of Gray", which was tentatively titled "Mehtä".

On 16 January 2013, Amorphis revealed the second release date of the album to be 19 April 2013. On 24 January 2013, the band revealed the track listing and cover art for Circle. Besides being available on CD, the album will also be released as a CD/DVD digibook (which includes a "Making of Circle" documentary and a music video for "Nightbird's Song"), a gatefold LP, and as a limited edition box set, containing three bonus track and a wristband. On 14 February, Amorphis announced that they would be performing Circle in its entirety at a special record-release show, on 25 April at the Circus in Helsinki. On 1 March, Amorphis released the first single from Circle, entitled "Hopeless Days". The lyric video for the song was released the same day. The tracks "Shades of Gray" and "Enchanted by the Moon" were released online on 29 March and 5 April respectively. On 12 April, "The Wanderer" was released as the second single from the album. On 19 April 2013, Amorphis released the  official music video for "Hopeless Days". Circle was released in Europe on 19 April 2013 and reached number one in Finland.

Track listing

Limited edition bonus DVD 
 "The Making of 'Circle'" – 1:00:31
 "Nightbird's Song" (video) – 5:10
 "Photo Gallery" – 2:42

Personnel

Amorphis 
 Tomi Joutsen – vocals
 Esa Holopainen – lead guitar
 Tomi Koivusaari – rhythm guitar
 Niclas Etelävuori – bass
 Santeri Kallio – keyboards
 Jan Rechberger – drums

Other personnel 
 Peter Tägtgren – production, mixing
 Tom Bates – cover art
 Sakari Kukko – woodwinds
 Mari M – female vocals
 Tuukka Helminen – cello
Jonas Kjellgren – mastering

Charts

References

External links 
 Amorphis' official band website

Amorphis albums
2013 albums
Nuclear Blast albums
Albums produced by Peter Tägtgren